Ray Smith (born c. 1928) is a retired Canadian football player who played for the Ottawa Rough Riders. He previously played football at the University of Tennessee.

References

Possibly living people
1920s births
Players of American football from Tennessee
American football guards
Canadian football guards
American players of Canadian football
Tennessee Volunteers football players
Ottawa Rough Riders players
People from Knoxville, Tennessee